Guadalupe is a town in Maricopa County, Arizona, United States and part of the great Phoenix metropolitan area.  The town motto, "where three cultures flourish", recognizes the town's roots in the Yaquis, Mexicans and descendants of the original farmers. Since its founding, Guadalupe has been known as a center of Yaqui culture, and it is home to many religious festivals. Nestled between Phoenix and Tempe, the 2020 census listed the population of the town as 5,322. Guadalupe was founded around 1900 by Yaqui Indians, who fled their homeland in Sonora to avoid oppression by the Mexican government of Porfirio Díaz. The cemetery of Guadalupe was established in 1904, in the original townsite. The cemetery is now officially located in Tempe, due to that city's annexation of the land surrounding the cemetery; however, it is still administered by the Guadalupe Clerk's Office. Guadalupe is primarily a residential area; most residents commute to other parts of the Phoenix area to work.

Geography
Guadalupe is located at  (33.366733, -111.962414). It is bordered to the west by Phoenix and to the north, east, and south by Tempe.

Governmental representation
Guadalupe is in Arizona's 7th Congressional District, served by Representative Ruben Gallego.  It is also in Arizona's 27th State Legislative District, served by Representatives Reginald Bolding, Jr. and Diego Rodriguez, and by Senator Rebecca Ríos.  All four of the aforementioned officials are Democrats.

Healthcare
The public hospital system, Valleywise Health (formerly Maricopa Integrated Health System), operates Valleywise Community Health Center – Guadalupe. Its sole hospital, Valleywise Health Medical Center, is in Phoenix.

Demographics

As of the census of 2000, there were 5,228 people, 1,110 households, and 961 families residing in the town. The racial makeup of the town was 72.3% Hispanic or Latino of any race, 44.2% Native American, 31.2% from other races, 17.5% White, 1.1% Black or African American 0.1% Asian, 0.2% Pacific Islander, and 5.7% from two or more races.

There were 1,110 households, out of which 44.0% had children under the age of 18 living with them, 49.0% were married couples living together, 27.3% had a female householder with no husband present, and 13.4% were non-families. 9.5% of all households were made up of individuals, and 3.8% had someone living alone who was 65 years of age or older. The average household size was 4.70 and the average family size was 4.88.

In the town, the population was spread out, with 37.2% under the age of 18, 12.5% from 18 to 24, 27.4% from 25 to 44, 16.1% from 45 to 64, and 6.8% who were 65 years of age or older. The median age was 25 years. For every 100 females, there were 105.3 males. For every 100 females age 18 and over, there were 106.9 males.

The median home prices as of 2022 is $279,142.  In 2022, the average household income was $59,751, and the median income for a family was $42,833. The per capita income for the town was $8,149. About 24.3% of families and 26.7% of the population were below the poverty line, including 30.8% of those under age 18 and 42.4% of those age 65 or over.

Images

References

External links

 
 Guadalupe community profile from Arizona Department of Commerce
 

Mexican-American culture in Arizona
Populated places established in 1900
Towns in Maricopa County, Arizona
Yaqui culture
Phoenix metropolitan area
1900 establishments in Arizona Territory